Lebuh Wadi Ehsan is a major highway in Putrajaya, Malaysia. It connects Lebuh Seri Setia interchange in the north to Persiaran Selatan interchange in the south.

Lists of interchanges

Highways in Malaysia
Highways in Putrajaya

References